William R. "Ray" Saunders was a college football player.

College football
Saunders was a tackle for the Tennessee Volunteers of the University of Tennessee.  Saunders suffered the first injury of 1930 with a minor knee injury. Saunders was selected All-Southern in 1931 along with teammates and College Football Hall of Fame members Herman Hickman and Gene McEver. He was also selected third-team All-American by the "Captain's Poll", selected by a poll of the captains of the major football teams

References

All-Southern college football players
Tennessee Volunteers football players
American football tackles